Cvitanovich is a surname. Notable people with the surname include:
 Frank Cvitanovich (1927–1995), Canadian documentary film maker
 John Cvitanovich (1930–2002), Canadian football player